Hypopyra carneotincta is a moth of the family Erebidae. It is found in Botswana and South Africa.

References

Moths of Africa
Moths described in 1913
Hypopyra